The 2017 FIFA Beach Soccer World Cup was an international beach soccer tournament held in the Bahamas from 27 April to 7 May 2017. The 16 national teams involved in the tournament were required by FIFA to register a squad of 12 players, including two goalkeepers. Only players in these squads were eligible to take part in the tournament which was revealed on 20 April 2017.

This article lists the national beach soccer squads that took part in the tournament. The age listed for each player is as on 27 April 2017, the first day of the tournament and the names of the players shown are that of the FIFA Display Names listed on the official squad document issued by FIFA.

Group A

Head coach:  Alexandre Soares

Head coach: Angelo Schirinzi

Head coach: Jose Palma

Head coach: Oumar Sylla

Group B

Head coach: Audu Adamu

Head coach: Massimo Agostini

Head coach: Mohammad Mirshamsi

Head coach: Ramon Mejía

Group C

Head coach: Mohamed Bashir

Head coach:  Gustavo Zloccowick

Head coach: Mario Narciso

Head coach:  Shubert Perez

Group D

Head coach: Gilberto Sousa

Head coach: Teiva Izal

Head coach:  Marcelo Mendes

Head coach: Marcin Stanisławski

Statistics
Overall 192 players travelled to the Bahamas to compete in the tournament. Of these players, every member of each squad was registered with a club team in their own country, save for three Portuguese players who play abroad.

Twelve of the sixteen managers were managing their own nation's national team whilst four managed foreign teams in respect to their own nationality. Brazilian managers comprised the most head coaches, with four attending the finals.

Player Statistics

Average age of squads

References

External links
FIFA Beach Soccer World Cup, FIFA.com

Squads
Beach soccer tournament squads